Surachart Pisitwuttinan (formerly: "Suchart"; สุชาติ; born:  1950 in Nonthaburi province, central Thailand) is a Thai boxing manager, trainer and promoter. He is the founder and chairman of Nakornloung Boxing Promotion based in Nonthaburi. He is known as "Sia Hui" (เสี่ยฮุย).

Biography
He was born in Thai Chinese family in Nonthaburi province. His family carries on business in the entertainment industry. It owns several cinemas. For Surachart, he has a passion for boxing. Especially professional boxing since childhood. He often goes to training boxing at Yontarakit, the famous boxing gym at that time, located near his native. He competed in the Thailand National Games and won a gold medal in Bantamweight (118 lb) division. After that, he turned professional boxing and won by knocked out every consecutive six times at Lumpinee Stadium, and he was a boxing partner for Venice Borkhorsor, a WBC & Lineal Flyweight (112 lb) world title holder. He was considered a boxer who was good enough to be a world champion.

But his father did not like it for fear that he will be traumatized. When he was 18 years old, his father sent him to be a cinema manager in Chachoengsao province. But he still does not leave the boxing. He continued to visit the boxing match and catching up with the news feed in the boxing circles often.

In the fight between Gilberto Román and Kongtoranee Payakaroon in Super flyweight (115 lb) division in late 1986 at Indoor Stadium Huamark inside Huamark Sports Complex, Bangkok. After the match, the victory was Román. He brought his eldest son, "Pop" Chokchai, to sit on Román's lap and take a photo together. He often takes him to visit the boxing match often, he has a dream Chokchai in the future will be the first Thai boxer to win the Summer Olympic Games gold medal. He instilled a love of boxing for all his children.

He started as a promoter in 1994, starting with Veeraphol Sahaprom, including many other boxers such as Suvatchai Chalermsri, Chaosingthong Chalermsri, Samanchai Chalermsri, Daonuea Chalermsri (Napapol Kiatisakchokchai), Thong Por Chokchai and Sirimongkol Singwangcha also one moment.

Currently, there are several boxers in his stable viz Suriyan Sor Rungvisai, Nawaphon Sor Rungvisai, Srisaket Sor Rungvisai and Pongsaklek Sithdabnij.

Today, in Nakornloung Boxing Promotion his eldest son,  Chokchai "Pop" Pisitwuttinan was the head trainer and his third son, Thainchai "Bank" Pisitwuttinan is an assistant manager.

Besides boxing, he is also the owner of several cinemas in Bangkok and its suburbs such as NK THX, Phueng Luang Rama, Nakornloung Rama etc. (now all closed down). His younger brother, Supote Pisitwuttinan has been two times president of the Federation of National Film Associations of Thailand  (currently The National Federation of Motion Pictures and Contents Associations (MPC)).

References

External links
Nakornloung Boxing Promotion Official Website

1950 births
Surachart Pisitwuttinan
Living people
Boxing promoters
Boxing managers
Surachart Pisitwuttinan
Surachart Pisitwuttinan
Surachart Pisitwuttinan
Boxing trainers
Surachart Pisitwuttinan